The Judson Memorial Church is located on Washington Square South between Thompson Street and Sullivan Street, near Gould Plaza, opposite Washington Square Park, in the Greenwich Village neighborhood of the New York City borough of Manhattan. It is affiliated with the American Baptist Churches USA and with the United Church of Christ.

The church sanctuary, its campanile tower and the attached Judson Hall were designated landmarks by the New York City Landmarks Preservation Commission in 1966, and were added to the National Register of Historic Places in 1974.

History

Founding
By the mid-19th century, the village had the largest African-American community in the city, along with joined German, French and Irish immigrants, and to the immediate south a majority of Italian immigrants. Earlier more affluent communities had begun an exodus from the adjacent neighborhoods to the south and east. Judson observed that the "tendency is for the intelligent, well-to-do and church-going people to withdraw from this part of the city". The park and the new church stood at the intersection between the affluence of Fifth Avenue and the poverty of Lower Manhattan.

The church was founded by Edward Judson who had been preaching at the Berean Baptist Church on Downing Street, also in the village, but his efforts at expanding the congregation were so successful that a new sanctuary was required.  In 1888, with the backing of John D. Rockefeller and other prominent Baptists, construction of a new church south of the park was begun.  Judson had chosen the location because he wanted to reach out to the neighboring communities.  It was to be a memorial to Judson's father, Adoniram Judson, one of the first Protestant missionaries to Burma. The church building was designed by architect Stanford White, with stained glass windows by John La Farge. It features Renaissance influences wedded to a basic Italianate form. Sculptor Augustus Saint-Gaudens designed a marble frieze in the baptistery, which was carried out by Herbert Adams; it was completed in 1893.

As well as worship and religious education, the church offered health-care and outreach ministries to non-members as well as members.  However, the church was not able to attract sufficient support from its wealthy neighbors on the north side of square, and by 1912, the church found itself in financial difficulties.  The Baptist City Society (metropolitan association of Baptist churches) was persuaded to take over the property and financial responsibility, which it ended up holding until the congregation was again able to resume ownership and control in 1973.

Early 20th century
In 1921, under the leadership of its pastor, A. Ray Petty, the church offered first its basement and then rented its parish house on Thompson Street to Dr. Eleanor A. Campbell, a pioneering female physician who ran the Judson Health Center, a free medical and dental clinic.  The center operated at 237 Thompson Street from 1922 to 1950, when the clinic moved to its present location on Spring Street in SoHo, the neighborhood to the south. During the 1920s, the church, with aid from the national American Baptist denomination, also ran the Judson Neighborhood House, a settlement house, at 179 Sullivan Street.

During the Great Depression in the early 20th century, Laurence Hosie served as pastor.  Although the congregation dwindled, the church remained active in various social causes, including allowing homeless men to sleep on the pews at times.  In 1937, the Baptist City Society appointed Renato Giacomelli Alden as pastor.

After World War II, with the rush of new students the former parish house and health center was turned into a residence for international students and students of various races, led by Dean R. Wright, the Baptist chaplain to New York University, the church's neighbor.  At the same time, a new pastor, Robert Spike, began theological explorations with veterans and the artists then working in the village, which brought a new group of congregants and led to a change in the church's worship style to a more modern sensibility.

Late 20th century
In 1956, Howard Moody became the senior minister, continuing the church's outspoken advocacy on issues of civil rights and free expression, as well as breaking with the confessedly evangelical understandings of the past by speaking out for issues once universally considered to be immoral by Christians (such as abortion and the decriminalization of prostitution), a policy that continues under the present leadership of the congregation. Al Carmines, the associate pastor 1962 to 1979, focused his ministry on the arts (see below).  The congregation expanded during this period, allowing the church to take back control of its property from the citywide Baptist organization that had been acting as trustee until 1973. Following Moody's retirement in 1990, Peter Laarman became senior pastor.  Coming from a background in union organizing, Laarman led the church into ministries dealing with economic issues, while continuing work with the arts and other social issues, and starting a multi-year program of restoration and renovation of the church's aging buildings.

Since becoming senior minister in 2005, senior pastor Donna Schaper has created a pioneering program to train future clergy in how to do "public ministry" from a congregational base, by providing part-time apprenticeships to seminarians and recent graduates.  Also under her leadership, the church has taken a leadership role in the New Sanctuary Movement for immigrant rights.

Mission

The church's mission has long been self-described as being devoted to social outreach, and establishing programs designed to help those perceived to be in need, despite the controversial or sometimes, unpopular, nature of that help.

In the 1950s, the church was the first institution in the village to create a counseling program for drug addicts; in the 1960s, it led in helping to found the Clergy Consultation Service on Abortion, a nationwide network of Protestant and Jewish clergy who aided women who needed abortions before abortion became legal.  In the 1970s, the church operated a residence for runaway teens and established a Professional Women's Clinic for women engaged in prostitution; in the 1980s, it helped provide medical resources for people with AIDS.

In the first decade of the 21st century, the church's clergy operated a relief fund for the families of restaurant workers who were killed during the September 11, 2001, attacks of New York City's World Trade Center.  Now, the church is active in the New Sanctuary Movement for immigrant rights.

Early community outreach
Verne E. Henderson joined the Judson staff in 1952 as its first Director of Community Service.  A program for youth of the village – started originally by the Police Athletic League of New York City – blossomed under Henderson's leadership with more than two hundred youth attending one or more weekly events.  Many youth were hard-core delinquents and drug users.  Henderson appeared in courts on behalf of those facing legal action and began summer youth programs in upstate New York and Vermont.  Henderson also inaugurated programs for local artists, remodeling the sanctuary for art shows and refurbishing abandoned offices as living quarters for resident artists.  Henderson once invited Martha Graham to use the sanctuary for dress rehearsals, which eventually led to formation of the Judson Dance Theatre.

Sponsorship of the arts
Beginning in the 1950s, the church supported a radical arts ministry, first led by associate pastor Bernard Scott and subsequently by associate pastor Al Carmines. The church made space available to artists for art exhibitions, rehearsals, and performances. The church also assured that this space was to be a place where these artists could have the freedom to experiment in their work without fear of censorship. In 1957, the church offered gallery space to Claes Oldenburg, Jim Dine and Robert Rauschenberg, who were then unknown artists. In 1959, the Judson Gallery showed work by pop artists, Tom Wesselmann, Daniel Spoerri, and Red Grooms. Yoko Ono also had her work exhibited at the gallery. The gallery space housed Fluxus happenings, including Some Manipulations (1969), a series of performances at the Judson Church by Fluxus artists Jean Toche, Steve Young, Nam June Paik, and Al Hansen, and work by Nye Ffarrabas.

The Judson Dance Theater, which began in 1962, provided a venue for dancers and choreographers including Trisha Brown, Lucinda Childs, Steve Paxton, David Gordon and Yvonne Rainer to create and show their work. Among others, these dancers and choreographers shaped dance history by creating postmodern dance, the first avant-garde movement in dance theater since the modern dance of the 1930s and 1940s.  For the past several decades, Movement Research has presented concerts of experimental dance at the church on Monday evenings during the academic year.

In the 1970s, the church hosted various art shows and multimedia events. Most notable among these multimedia events was the People's Flag Show in November 1970, a six-day exhibition of painting and sculpture on the theme of the American flag. The exhibit and the accompanying symposium, featuring speeches by Abbie Hoffman and Kate Millet, attracted widespread attention from the public, the press and the police. During the final days of the exhibit, three of the contributing artists were arrested, both pastors (Moody and Carmines) were issued summons (not followed up), and the District Attorney closed the exhibit on charges of desecration of the American flag.

The Judson Poets' Theatre started in November 1961 – with a play by poet Joel Oppenheimer – as one of three off-off-Broadway venues (the others were Caffe Cino and La MaMa Experimental Theatre Club).  Experimental plays and musicals by later-famous authors and directors, including Sam Shepherd, Lanford Wilson and Tom O'Horgan, were presented in the church's main Meeting Room.  Starting in the late 1960s, Carmines began writing and producing his own musicals, and later, "oratorios" that used large volunteer choruses.  Especially notable were several shows using texts by Gertrude Stein, music by Carmines, with direction by the Judson Poets Theatre director Lawrence Kornfeld.

In the 1980s, the church sponsored various Politically intended dramatic performances, such as those by the Vermont-based Bread and Puppet Theater. These performances included Insurrection Opera and Oratorio, performed in February and March 1984. In this performance, the Bread and Puppet Theater, under the direction of its founder, Peter Schumann, used opera and the company's now signature oversized puppets to convey an anti-nuclear message.  The church has recently become the home of the West Village Chorale, directed by Dr. Colin Britt.  The Chorale's former home was St. Luke's in the Fields on Hudson Street.

The church celebrated its centennial in 1990 with performances and symposia involving many of the artists who had been involved with the arts ministry in the 1960s and 1970s. It continues both its support of the arts and its social outreach to the community.

Building
The church building is located at 54–57 Washington Square South. In addition to La Farge's stained-glass windows and Saint-Gaudens's marble frieze, it features Italian Renaissance influences wedded to a basic Italianate form, and has notable examples of scagliola, a very convincing handcrafted imitation of marble made of highly polished pigmented plaster. Overall, the exterior and shape of the building is said to resemble the Basilica di Santa Maria Maggiore in Rome, Italy, while the entrance is said to be inspired by the Renaissance church San Alessandro, built in Lucca, Italy, in 1480. The fourteen stained glass windows in the church's main sanctuary are the largest collection of major LaFarge windows in any one place in the U.S.

The campanile tower, located at 51–54 Washington Square South to the west of the church itself, was built in 1895–96, after the sanctuary had been completed, and was designed by the firm of McKim, Mead & White. The adjacent Hall, however, predates the church, having been built in 1877, and was designed by John G. Prague.

In 1999, facing financial difficulties, the church's board of trustees sold the Judson House, the parish building behind the church, to New York University School of Law, which used the site for its new Furman Hall.  At eleven stories tall, the new building now towers over the church and Washington Square Park beyond, causing considerable controversy in the community at the time of its construction.  The church's offices and a small assembly hall now occupy a condominium suite in one corner of the new building, adjacent to the main church, at 239 Thompson Street.

From 1990 to 2006, the church building was repainted, reroofed; the stained glass windows were cleaned and reinstalled by Cummings Studio; an elevator was installed to make the building accessible and air conditioning was added.  These projects exhausted all the proceeds from the sale of the back lots, plus approximately $1 million additional (equivalent to  million in ), raised from contributions of arts patrons and the congregation.

Ministers and staff

Rev. Edward Judson (minister, 1890–1914)
Rev. A. Ray Petty (minister, 1915–1926)
Rev. Laurence T. Hosie (minister, 1926–1937)
Rev. Renato Giacomelli Alden ( minister to Italian-speaking congregation, 1937–1946; sole minister after Hosie's departure)
Rev. Elbert R. Tingley (City Society's appointed executive director for Judson, 1946–1948)
Rev. Dean Wright (Director, Judson House Student Program, 1948–1952)
Rev. Robert Spike (minister, 1949–1955)
Verne E Henderson, Director of Community Service during Spike's ministry (1952–1955)
Bernard (Bud) Scott (seminary intern under Spike; associate minister under Moody, 1957–1960), serving as missionary to the surrounding artistic community
Rev. Howard Moody (minister, 1956–1992)
Rev. Al Carmines (associate minister, 1961–1981)
Arthur A. Levin (Director of The Center for Medical Consumers, since 1976; also, administration for many church-related projects since 1966, including the Judson Teenage Arts Workshop, Judson mobile health project, and Judson Runaway House)
Arlene Carmen ("administrix" 1967–1994; "administrix" over those years encompassed first being Moody's secretary, then Church Administrator, and finally, in the mid-1980s, Program Associate was added to the Administrator title)
Roland Wiggins (sexton, mid-1970s-2016)
Rev. Dr. Lee Hancock (associate minister, 1981–1985)
Rev. Dr. Bill Malcomson (interim minister, 1992–1994)
Andrew Frantz (Sunday School Director, since 1993)
Rev. Peter Laarman (minister, 1994–2004)
Ryan Gillam (Special Program Associate for theatre, 1994–1996)
Aziza (Special Program Associate, 1993–2002) (producer for Licks 'n Licks, Single Mothers' Workshop, Dance of African Descent Downtown)
Rev. Louise Green (associate minister, 1996–1998)
Rev. Karen Senecal (associate minister; sole minister after Laarman, 2000–2005)
Rev. Dr. Donna Schaper (senior minister, since January 2006)
Rev. Michael Ellick (assistant minister, 2008–2014)
Paul Russell (communications director, since 2011)
Rev. Micah Bucey (minister, since 2011)
Rev. Valerie Holly (minister, since 2020)
Rev. Julie Johnson Staples (transition minister, 2021-2023)

See also

List of New York City Landmarks

References
Notes

Further reading
Carmen, Arlene and Moody, Howard. Abortion Counseling and Social Change: From Illegal Act to Medical Practice (Judson Press, 1973)
Carmen, Arlene and Moody, Howard. Working Women: The Subterranean World of Street Prostitution (Harper & Row, 1985)
Dickason, E. & J. eds. Remembering Judson House (1999)

External links

Video (May 10, 2007).  Interview of Reverend Donna Schaper.  The O'Reilly Factor.
Video (May 13, 2007). New Sanctuary Movement (Reverend Donna Schaper and Jean and his family) on Geraldo at Large.
Donna O. Schaper Papers at Gettysburg College
Guide to the Dickason papers at NYU's Fales Library; these are the papers related to the book Remembering Judson House by E. & J. Dickason
Associate Minister Micah Bucey on the MikeyPod Podcast

Archives
Judson Memorial Church Archive at the Fales Library of New York University
Judson Memorial Church Oral History Archive at the Fales Library

Baptist churches in New York City
Churches completed in 1893
19th-century Protestant churches
Churches in Manhattan
New York City Designated Landmarks in Manhattan
Properties of religious function on the National Register of Historic Places in Manhattan
Religious organizations established in 1890
United Church of Christ churches in New York City
Greenwich Village
1890 establishments in New York (state)